"Just Another Victim" is a single by alternative metal band Helmet and rap group House of Pain that was released from the Judgment Night soundtrack. Aside from the original version of the song, the single also included several remixes by producer T-Ray that also appeared on the B-side of Faith No More and Boo-Yaa T.R.I.B.E.'s "Another Body Murdered".

Accolades

Track listing
"Just Another Victim" (Album Version)- 4:20 
"Just Another Victim" (T-Ray Devil Worship Mix)- 4:35 
"Just Another Victim" (Instrumental)- 4:20

B-Side
"Just Another Victim" (T-Ray Dead and Stinking Mix)- 4:35
"Just Another Victim" (T-Ray Heavy Metal Jazz Mix)- 2:28

Charts

References

1993 singles
Helmet (band) songs
House of Pain songs
1993 songs
Epic Records singles
Rap metal songs